Martha's Vineyard,  often simply called the Vineyard, is an island in the Northeastern United States, located south of Cape Cod in Dukes County, Massachusetts,  known for being a popular, affluent summer colony. Martha's Vineyard includes the smaller adjacent Chappaquiddick Island, which is usually connected to the Vineyard. The two islands have sometimes been separated by storms and hurricanes, which last occurred from 2007 to 2015. Martha's Vineyard constitutes the bulk of Dukes County, which also includes the Elizabeth Islands and the island of Nomans Land.

The Vineyard was home to one of the earliest known Deaf communities in the United States; consequently, a sign language, the Martha's Vineyard Sign Language, emerged on the island among both Deaf and hearing islanders. The 2010 census reported a year-round population of 16,535 residents, although the summer population can swell to more than 750,000 people. About 56 percent of the Vineyard's 14,621 homes are seasonally occupied.

Martha's Vineyard is primarily known as a summer colony. However, its year-round population has considerably increased since the 1960s. The island's year-round population increased about a third each decade from 1970 to 2000, for a total of 145 percent or about 3 percent to 4 percent per year (46 percent, 30 percent, and 29 percent in each respective decade). The population of the Vineyard was 14,901 in the 2000 Census and was estimated at 15,582 in 2004. (Dukes County was 14,987 in 2000 and 15,669 in 2004). Dukes County includes the six towns on Martha's Vineyard and Gosnold; it increased by more than 10 percent between 2000 and 2010, according to Census data released in 2011, gaining nearly 1,548 residents. The Island's population increased from 14,987 to 16,535.

A study by the Martha's Vineyard Commission found that the cost of living on the island is 60 percent higher than the national average, and housing prices are 96 percent higher. A study of housing needs by the Commission found that the average weekly wage on Martha's Vineyard was "71 percent of the state average, the median home price was 54 percent above the state's and the median rent exceeded the state's by 17 percent," all leading to a stark example of severe income inequalities between year-round residents and their seasonal counterparts.

Toponym

There is no definitive source for the name 'Martha's Vineyard', but it is thought to be named for the mother-in-law or daughter, both named Martha, of the English explorer Bartholomew Gosnold, who led the first recorded European expedition to Cape Cod in 1602. A smaller island to the south was first to be named "Martha's Vineyard" but this later became associated with this island. It is the eighth-oldest surviving English place-name in the United States. The island was subsequently known as Martin's Vineyard (perhaps after the captain of Gosnold's ship, John Martin); many islanders up to the 18th century called it by this name.

When the United States Board on Geographic Names worked to standardize placename spellings in the late 19th century, apostrophes were dropped. Thus for a time Martha's Vineyard was officially named Marthas Vineyard, but the Board reversed its decision in the early 20th century, making Martha's Vineyard one of the five placenames in the United States that take a possessive apostrophe.

According to historian Henry Franklin Norton, the island was known by Native Americans as Noepe or Capawock.  It is referred to in the 1691 Massachusetts Charter (which transferred the island from Province of New York during the breakup of the Dominion of New England) as Cappawock.

History

Pre-European settlement
The island was originally inhabited by Wampanoag people, when Martha's Vineyard was known in the Massachusett language as Noepe, or "land amid the streams". In 1642, the Wampanoag numbered somewhere around 3,000 on the island. By 1764, that number had dropped to 313.

Colonial era

European settlement began with the purchase of Martha's Vineyard, Nantucket, and the Elizabeth Islands by Thomas Mayhew of Watertown, Massachusetts from two New England settlers. He had friendly relations with the Wampanoags on the island, in part because he was careful to honor their land rights. His son, also named Thomas Mayhew, established the first settlement on the island in 1642 at Great Harbor (later Edgartown, Massachusetts).

The younger Mayhew began a relationship with Hiacoomes, a Native American neighbor, which eventually led to Hiacoomes' family converting to Christianity. During King Philip's War later in the century, the Martha's Vineyard band did not join their tribal relatives in the uprising and remained armed, a testimony to the good relations cultivated by the Mayhews as the leaders of the colony.
In 1657, the younger Thomas Mayhew was drowned when a ship he was travelling in was lost at sea on a voyage to England. Mayhew's grandsons Matthew Mayhew (1648), John Mayhew (1652), and other members of his family assisted him in running his business and government. In 1665, Mayhew's lands were included in a grant to the Duke of York. In 1671, a settlement was arranged which allowed Mayhew to continue in his position while placing his territory under the jurisdiction of the Province of New York. In 1682, Matthew Mayhew succeeded his grandfather as Governor and Chief Magistrate, and occasionally preached to the Native Americans. He was also appointed judge of the Court of Common Pleas for Dukes county in 1697, and remained on the bench until 1700. He was judge of probate from 1696 to 1710. In 1683, Dukes County, New York was incorporated, including Martha's Vineyard. In 1691, at the collapse of rule by Sir Edmund Andros and the reorganization of Massachusetts as a royal colony, Dukes County was transferred back to the Province of Massachusetts Bay, and split into the county of Dukes County, Massachusetts and Nantucket County, Massachusetts.

Native American literacy in the schools founded by Thomas Mayhew Jr. and taught by Peter Folger, the grandfather of Benjamin Franklin, was such that the first Native American graduates of Harvard were from Martha's Vineyard, including the son of Hiacoomes, Joel Hiacoomes. "The ship Joel Hiacoomes was sailing on, as he was returning to Boston from a trip home shortly before the graduation ceremonies, was found wrecked on the shores of Nantucket Island. Caleb Cheeshahteaumauk, the son of a sachem of Homes Hole, did graduate from Harvard in the class of 1665." Cheeshahteaumauk's Latin address to the corporation (New England Corporation), which begins "Honoratissimi benefactores" (most honored benefactors), has been preserved. In addition to speaking Wampanoag and English, they studied Hebrew, Classical Greek, and Latin. All of the early Native American graduates died shortly after completing their course of study. Many native preachers on the island, however, also preached in the Christian churches from time to time.

Mayhew's successor as leader of the community was the Hon. Leavitt Thaxter, who married Martha Mayhew, a descendant of Thomas Mayhew, and was an Edgartown educator described by Indian Commissioner John Milton Earle as "a long and steadfast friend to the Indians." After living in Northampton, Thaxter, a lawyer, returned home to Edgartown, where he took over the school founded by his father, Rev. Joseph Thaxter, and served in the State House and the Senate, was a member of the Massachusetts Governor's Council and later served as U. S. Customs Collector for Martha's Vineyard. Having rechristened his father's Edgartown school Thaxter Academy, Hon. Leavitt Thaxter was granted on February 15, 1845, the sum of $50-per-year for "the support of William Johnson, an Indian of the Chappequiddic tribe." By this time, Leavitt Thaxter had taken on the role, described in an act passed by the General Court of Massachusetts, as "guardian of the Indians and people of color resident at Chappequiddic and Indiantown in the County of Dukes County." Thaxter Academy, founded by Leavitt Thaxter as first principal in 1825, became known for educating both white and Native American youth.

19th century
Like the nearby island of Nantucket, Martha's Vineyard was brought to prominence in the 19th century by the whaling industry, during which ships were sent around the world to hunt whales for their oil and blubber. The discovery of petroleum in Pennsylvania gave rise to a cheaper source of oil for lamps and led to an almost complete collapse of the industry by 1870. After the Old Colony railroad came to mainland Woods Hole in 1872, summer residences began to develop on the island, such as the community of Harthaven established by William H. Hart, and later, the community of Ocean Heights, developed near Sengekontacket Pond in Edgartown by the prominent island businessman, Robert Marsden Laidlaw. Although the island struggled financially through the Great Depression, its reputation as a resort for tourists and the wealthy continued to grow. There is still a substantial Wampanoag population on the Vineyard, mainly located in the town of Aquinnah. Aquinnah means "land under the hill" in the Wampanoag language.

The island was the last refuge of the heath hen, an extinct subspecies of the greater prairie chicken, which was a once common game bird throughout the Northeastern United States. Despite 19th century efforts to protect the hen, by 1927, the population of birds had dropped to 13. The last known heath hen, named "Booming Ben", perished on Martha's Vineyard in 1932.

Modern era

Martha's Vineyard was used by the Army, Navy and Air Force from 1941 through 1945 with training missions that ranged from landings on beaches to climbing cliffs and bombing practice.
 
The linguist William Labov wrote his MA essay on changes in the Martha's Vineyard dialect of English. The 1963 study is widely recognized as a seminal work in the foundation of sociolinguistics.

The island received international notoriety after the "Chappaquiddick incident" of July 18, 1969, in which Mary Jo Kopechne was killed in a car driven off the Dike Bridge by U.S. Senator Edward "Ted" Kennedy. The bridge crossed Poucha Pond on Chappaquiddick Island (a smaller island formerly connected to the Vineyard and part of Edgartown). As a foot bridge, it was intended for people on foot and bicycles, as well as the occasional emergency vehicle when conditions warranted. Currently, 4×4 vehicles with passes are allowed to cross the reconstructed bridge.

On November 23, 1970, in the Atlantic Ocean just west of Aquinnah, Simas Kudirka, a Soviet seaman of Lithuanian nationality, attempted to defect to the United States by leaping onto a United States Coast Guard cutter from a Soviet fishing trawler and asking for asylum. The Coast Guard allowed a detachment of four seamen from the Soviet ship to board the cutter and "drag the kicking, screaming Kudirka back to their vessel." He was sentenced to 10 years of hard labor in the Soviet Union.

In 1974, Steven Spielberg filmed the movie Jaws on Martha's Vineyard, most notably in the fishing village of Menemsha and the town of Chilmark. Spielberg selected island natives Christopher Rebello as Chief Brody's oldest son, Michael Brody; Jay Mello as the younger son, Sean Brody; and Lee Fierro as Mrs. Kintner. Scores of other island natives appeared in the film as extras. Later, scenes from Jaws 2 and Jaws: The Revenge were filmed on the island, as well. In June 2005 the island celebrated the 30th anniversary of Jaws with a weekend-long Jawsfest.

In 1977, distressed over losing their guaranteed seat in the Massachusetts General Court, inhabitants of Martha's Vineyard considered the possibility of secession from the Commonwealth of Massachusetts, either to become part of another state (having received offers from both Vermont and Hawaii), reincorporating as a separate U.S. territory, or as the nation's 51st state. The separatist flag, consisting of a white seagull over an orange disk on a sky-blue background, is still seen on the island today. Although the idea of separation from Massachusetts eventually proved impracticable, it did receive attention in the local, regional, and even national media.

On March 5, 1982, John Belushi died of a drug overdose in Los Angeles, California, and was buried four days later in Abel's Hill Cemetery in Chilmark. Belushi often visited the Vineyard and his family felt it fitting to bury him there. On his gravestone is the quote: "Though I may be gone, Rock 'N' Roll lives on." Because of the many visitors to his grave and the threat of vandalism, his body was moved somewhere near the grave site. His grave remains a popular site for visitors to Chilmark and they often leave tokens in memory of the late comedian.

Since the 1990s, Bill Clinton spent regular vacation time on the island during and after his presidency, along with his wife, Hillary Clinton, and their daughter, Chelsea. Clinton was not the first president to visit the islands; Ulysses S. Grant visited the vacation residence of his friend, Bishop Gilbert Haven on August 24, 1874. As a coincidental footnote in history, Bishop Haven's gingerbread cottage was located in Oak Bluffs at 10 Clinton Avenue. The avenue was named in 1851 and was designated as the main promenade of the Martha's Vineyard Campmeeting Association campgrounds. On August 23, 2009, Barack Obama arrived in Chilmark with his family for a week's vacation at a rental property known as Blue Heron Farm. In December 2019, President Barack Obama completed the purchase of a  homestead on the Edgartown Great Pond.

On July 16, 1999, a small plane crashed off the coast of Martha's Vineyard, claiming the lives of pilot John F. Kennedy Jr., his wife Carolyn Bessette and her sister Lauren Bessette. Kennedy's mother, former U.S. first lady Jacqueline Kennedy Onassis, maintained a home in Aquinnah (formerly "Gay Head") until her death in 1994.

In the summer of 2000, an outbreak of tularemia, also known as rabbit fever, resulted in one death and piqued the interest of the CDC, which wanted to test the island as a potential investigative ground for aerosolized Francisella tularensis. Over the following summers, Martha's Vineyard was identified as the only place in the world where documented cases of tularemia resulted from lawn mowing. The research could prove valuable in preventing bioterrorism. In the television show The X-Files, Fox Mulder's parents live on the island, and it was also the setting for Robert Harris' 2007 novel The Ghost.

In September 2022, Florida governor Ron DeSantis flew two planeloads of Venezuelan refugees to Martha's Vineyard in an effort to draw attention to what Republican governors consider "the Biden administration's failed border policies". DeSantis was harshly criticized for this action, primarily because the migrants were flown there unannounced, and subsequently abandoned, before island residents stepped in, welcoming the migrants, and generously providing needed essentials, such as clothing, food, toys and  toiletries, as well as temporary shelter at a church, while they awaited more permanent accommodations locally and elsewhere.

African American history on Martha's Vineyard 
There is ample evidence to show that people were bought, sold, and probated as property on Martha's Vineyard. In 1700, Reverend Samuel Sewall, a seasonal resident of Martha's Vineyard, was one of the first to publicly oppose slavery in the New England Colonies. In 1646, magistrates  in Massachusetts ruled that 2 Africans who had been enslaved and imported be returned to their native country. In 1652, Rhode Island passed a law abolishing slavery and ordering that Africans be freed after a term of ten years, just like indentured servants. In addition to that, "at no time during its history did people of color lose the right to use the courts to challenge their status. Nor did they lose the right to inherit property in certain circumstances."
   
On October 15, 2020, Edgartown Harbour was officially recognized as an Underground Railroad Site by the National Park Service. This recognition was given after the submission from the non-profit corporation, The African American Heritage Trail of Martha's Vineyard. The corporation was founded in 1998 by Martha's Vineyard NAACP vice president Carrie Camillo Tankard and teacher Elaine Cawley Weintraub. Their mission is to "continue to research and publish previously undocumented history and to involve the Island community in the identification and celebration of the contributions made by people of color to the island of Martha's Vineyard." The trail consists of 31 sites all marked by a descriptive plaque.

Hereditary deafness and sign language
Martha's Vineyard became known as an "everyone signs" community after three centuries of an unusually high level of hereditary deafness caused Martha's Vineyard to be labeled a “deaf utopia”. The island's deaf heritage cannot be traced to one common ancestor and is thought to have originated in the Weald, a region that overlaps the borders of the English counties of Kent and Sussex, prior to immigration. Researcher Nora Groce estimates that by the late 19th century, 1 in 155 people on the Vineyard was born deaf (0.7 percent), about 37 times the estimate for the nation at large (1 in 5,728, or 0.02 percent), because of a "recessive pattern" of genetic deafness, circulated through endogamous marriage patterns.

Deaf Vineyarders generally earned an average or above-average income, proved by tax records, and they participated in church affairs with passion. The deafness on the island affected both females and males in approximately the same percentage. In the late 19th century, the mixed marriages between deaf and hearing spouses comprised 65 percent of all deaf marriages on the island, as compared to the rate of 20 percent deaf-hearing marriage in the mainland. The sign language used by Vineyarders is called Martha's Vineyard Sign Language (MVSL), and it is different from American Sign Language (ASL). However, the geographical, time, and population proximities state that MVSL and ASL are impossible to develop in complete isolation from each other. MVSL was commonly used by hearing residents as well as Deaf ones until the middle of the 20th century. No language barrier created a smooth communication environment for all the residences on the island.

In the 20th century, tourism became a mainstay in the island economy, and new tourism-related jobs appeared. However, jobs in tourism were not as deaf-friendly as fishing and farming had been. Consequently, as intermarriage and further migration joined the people of Martha's Vineyard to the mainland, the island community more and more resembled the oral community there. The last deaf person born into the island's sign-language tradition, Katie West, died in 1952, but a few elderly residents were able to recall MVSL as recently as the 1980s when research into the language began.

Climate
According to the Köppen climate classification system, the climate of the island borders between a humid continental climate (Dfa/Dfb), a humid subtropical climate (Cfa), and an oceanic climate (Cfb), the latter a climate type rarely found on the east coast of North America. Martha's Vineyard's climate is highly influenced by the surrounding Atlantic Ocean, which moderates temperatures throughout the year, although this moderation is nowhere as strong as on opposite sides of the Atlantic (Porto, Portugal) or the Pacific coast of the United States (Crescent City) at similar latitudes.

As a result, winter temperatures tend to be a few degrees warmer while summer temperatures tend to be cooler than inland locations. Winters are cool to cold with a January average of just slightly below . Owing to the influence of the Atlantic Ocean, temperatures below  are rare, occurring at least 1 day per year and most days during the winter months rise above freezing. Summers are warm and mild with temperatures rarely exceeding , with only 1 or 2 days reaching or exceeding it. Spring and fall are transition seasons with spring being cooler than fall. Martha's Vineyard receives  of precipitation per year, which is evenly distributed throughout the year. The hardiness zone is 7a.

Towns

Martha's Vineyard is divided into six towns. Each town is governed by a select board elected by town voters, along with annual and periodic town meetings. Each town is also a member of the Martha's Vineyard Commission, which regulates island-wide building, environmental, and aesthetic concerns.

Some government programs on the island—such as the public school system, emergency management, and waste management—have been regionalized. There is a growing push for further regionalization areas of law enforcement, water treatment, and possible government regionalization.

Each town also follows certain regulations from Dukes County. The towns are:
Tisbury, which includes the main village of Vineyard Haven and the West Chop peninsula. It is the island's primary port of entry for people and cargo, supplemented by the seasonal port in Oak Bluffs.
Edgartown, which includes Chappaquiddick Island and Katama. Edgartown is noted for its rich whaling tradition and is the island's largest town by population and area.
Oak Bluffs is best known for its gingerbread cottages, its open harbor, and its vibrant town along busy Circuit Avenue. Oak Bluffs enjoys a reputation as one of the more active night-life towns on the island for both residents and tourists. It was known as "Cottage City" from its separation from Edgartown in 1880 until its reincorporation as Oak Bluffs in 1907. Oak Bluffs includes several communities that have been popular destinations for affluent African Americans since the early 20th century. It also includes the East Chop peninsula, Lagoon Heights and Harthaven.
West Tisbury is the island's agricultural center, and it hosts the well-known Martha's Vineyard Agricultural Fair in late August each year.
Chilmark, including the fishing village of Menemsha. Chilmark is also rural, and it features the island's hilliest terrain. It is the birthplace of George Claghorn, master shipbuilder of the USS Constitution,  "Old Ironsides".
Aquinnah is home to the Wampanoag Indian tribe and clay cliffs.
The three "Down-Island" towns of Edgartown, Tisbury, and Oak Bluffs are "wet" towns—serving alcohol. West Tisbury and Aquinnah are "soggy" towns that serve only beer and wine, and Chilmark is a "dry" town.

Transportation

Water
Martha's Vineyard is located approximately seven miles off the southern coast of Cape Cod. It is reached by a ferry that departs from Woods Hole, Massachusetts, and by several other ferries departing from Falmouth, New Bedford, Hyannis, Quonset Point, Rhode Island, and the East 35th Street ferry terminal in Manhattan. The Steamship Authority operates most of the shorter routes, while Martha's Vineyard Fast Ferry and Hy-Line Cruises run faster, longer distance ferries to Rhode Island and Hyannis. There are direct ferries to each place. SeaStreak operates the seasonal, weekend New York City to Martha's Vineyard route. One ferry departs New York City on Friday afternoon and returns on Sunday night. The trip through Long Island Sound and along the shoreline of Rhode Island and Massachusetts takes about five and a quarter hours. In the era before modern highways and jet planes, travelers took New York, New Haven & Hartford Railroad trains from New York City or Boston to Woods Hole or Hyannis, at which point they would embark on ferries to the island.

Air

Commuter airline Cape Air offers frequent service to the island via the Martha's Vineyard Airport (MVY). It provides year-round service to and from Boston, Hyannis, New Bedford, and Nantucket, and seasonal service to White Plains, New York. American Airlines operates seasonal service to Washington-Reagan,  New York-LaGuardia, Philadelphia and as well Charlotte. JetBlue serves the island out of New York's Kennedy Airport, Boston, Newark, New York–LaGuardia, and Washington–National. Delta Connection also operates seasonal service to New York-LaGuardia and New York-JFK, Seasonal service flights also out of White Plains, New York.  once/day on Elite Airways to and from MVY. The airport also handles much general aviation traffic. Katama airpark, with grass runways, is popular with private pilots; it is located near South Beach..

Mass transit
Bus service is provided on the island year-round by the Martha's Vineyard Transit Authority (VTA).

Education

Martha's Vineyard is served by Martha's Vineyard Public Schools:
Edgartown School (Grades K-8)
West Tisbury School (Grades K–8)
Oak Bluffs School (Grades K–8)
Tisbury School (Grades K–8)
Chilmark School (Grades K–5)
Martha's Vineyard Public Charter School (Grades K–12)
Martha's Vineyard Regional High School (Grades 9–12)

Five of the six towns have their own elementary schools, while Aquinnah residents usually attend nearby Chilmark's elementary school. The Chilmark school serves only grades pre-K to 5, so students in grades 6–8 must attend another middle school—usually the West Tisbury school. The Martha's Vineyard Public Charter School, located in West Tisbury, provides grades K–12 and serves the entire island; it also welcomes off-island students. Martha's Vineyard Regional High School, which is located in Oak Bluffs, serves the entire island.

Tourism and culture
The Vineyard grew as a tourist destination primarily because of its very pleasant summer weather (during summers, the temperature rarely breaks ) and many beautiful beaches. It is primarily a place where people go to relax, and the island offers a range of tourist accommodations including large hotels such as the Harbor View Hotel, Mansion House Hotel and Winnetu Resort, modern boutique hotels like the Nobnocket Boutique Inn, as well as traditional inns and bed and breakfasts such as Outermost Inn, Beach Plum Inn, Ashley Inn, Pequot House and Oak Bluffs Inn. Many visitors also rent private homes.

During the whaling era, wealthy Boston sea captains and merchant traders often created estates on Martha's Vineyard with their trading profits. Today, the Vineyard has become one of the Northeastern United States' most prominent summering havens, having attracted numerous celebrity regulars.

The island now has a year-round population of about 17,000 people in six towns; in summer, the population increases to 200,000 residents, with more than 25,000 additional short-term visitors coming and going on the ferries during the summer season. The most crowded weekend is July 4, followed by the late-August weekend of the Agricultural Fair. In general, the summer season runs from June through Labor Day weekend, coinciding with the months most American children are not in school.

In 1985, the two islands of Martha's Vineyard and Chappaquiddick Island were included in a new American Viticultural Area designation for wine appellation of origin specification: Martha's Vineyard AVA. Wines produced from grapes grown on the two islands can be sold with labels that carry the Martha's Vineyard AVA designation. Martha's Vineyard was the home to the winemaker Chicama Vineyards in West Tisbury, though it closed after 37 years on August 10, 2008.

Other popular attractions include the annual Grand Illumination in Oak Bluffs;
the Martha's Vineyard Film Center, an arthouse cinema which the non-profit Martha's Vineyard Film Society, and which screens independent and world cinema all year long; the historic Capawock and Strand theatres, also run by the Martha's Vineyard Film Society, 
the Martha's Vineyard Film Festival, which runs a winter film festival in March, a Summer Film Series and Cinema Circus every Wednesday in July and August, the Martha's Vineyard African-American Film Festival, which showcases the works of independent and established African-American filmmakers in August, and
Martha's Vineyard International Film Festival in September;
the Farm Institute at Katama Farm in Edgartown;
and the Flying Horses Carousel in Oak Bluffs, the oldest operating platform carousel in the United States.

Across the Edgartown Vineyard Haven Road from the Martha's Vineyard Regional High School in the town of Oak Bluffs, the Martha's Vineyard Skatepark is a concrete skatepark open to the public, offering a range of ramps and obstacles.

Island life and residents

Its relatively small year-round population has led to a very activist citizenry who are highly involved in the island's day-to-day activities. Tourism, overdevelopment, politics, and environmentalism are of keen interest to the community. Keeping the balance between the much needed tourist economy and the ecology and wildlife of the island is of paramount importance to residents. In contrast to the seasonal influx of wealthy visitors, Dukes County remains one of the poorest in the state. Residents have established resources to balance the contradictions and stresses that can arise in these circumstances, notably the Martha's Vineyard Commission and Martha's Vineyard Community Services, founded by the late Dr. Milton Mazer, author of People and Predicaments: Of Life and Distress on Martha's Vineyard.

The majority of the Vineyard's residents during the summer are well-established seasonal vacationers. While many of these come from all over the United States and abroad, the island tends to be a destination for especially those whose primary residence lies within close proximity in the Northeastern U.S. Many communities around the island tend to have deep family roots on the island that have matured over the years to create hamlets of good friends and neighbors. Nevertheless, many visitors are summer renters and weekenders, for whom the island is simply a "home away from home".

Martha's Vineyard has also been or is home to a number of artists and musicians, including Albert Alcalay, Evan Dando, Tim "Johnny Vegas" Burton of the Mighty Mighty Bosstones, James Taylor, Carly Simon, Livingston Taylor, Kate Taylor, Alex Taylor, Tom Rush, Rick Marotta, Geoff Muldaur, Maria Muldaur, Willy Mason, Unbusted and Mike Nichols. Historian and author David McCullough is also an island resident, as are author Susan Branch and the young-adult books authors Judy Blume and Norman Bridwell, and crime/political intrigue novelists Richard North Patterson and Linda Fairstein. Late authors Shel Silverstein and William Styron also lived on the Vineyard, as did writer, journalist and teacher John Hersey, poet and novelist Dorothy West and artist Thomas Hart Benton. Various writers have been inspired by the island—including the mystery writer Philip R. Craig who set several novels on the island. On a related note, Martha's Vineyard Poet Laureate, Lee H. McCormack, has written many poems about the island. The Academy Award-winning Patricia Neal owned a home on South Water St in Edgartown, and James Cagney, Lillian Hellman (who is buried in Abel's Hill Cemetery near the site of Belushi's grave), and Katharine Cornell all found the Vineyard an exciting, rewarding place to live. In addition, the famous Life magazine photographer Alfred Eisenstaedt was a fifty-year summer resident of the Vineyard until his death in 1995. Since 2006 the Australian-born author Geraldine Brooks, writer of the Pulitzer Prize winning novel March, has lived there with her husband, Tony Horwitz, himself a Pulitzer Prize winner and successful novelist, and their two sons.

Brooks wrote a  book of historical fiction Caleb's Crossing in which Caleb Cheeshahteaumuck is the title character and depicts early colonial settlement of Martha's Vineyard.

Other well-known celebrities who live on or have regularly visited the island: Harlem Renaissance artist Lois Mailou Jones;  former president Bill Clinton and his wife, former Secretary of State Hillary Clinton; former U.S. President Barack Obama, comedian and talk show host David Letterman; Bill Murray; Tony Shalhoub; Quincy Jones; Ted Danson and wife Mary Steenburgen; Larry David; the Farrelly brothers; Meg Ryan; and Chelsea Handler. Mike Wallace of 60 Minutes was a summer resident of Martha's Vineyard. Late anchorman Walter Cronkite was a prominent summer resident as well. Other regularly appearing celebrities include film writer/director Spike Lee, attorney Alan Dershowitz, comedians Dan Aykroyd and James Belushi, politico Vernon Jordan, television news reporter Diane Sawyer, fashion designer Kenneth Cole, former Ambassador and President of the Metropolitan Museum of Art William H. Luers, and Charlayne Hunter-Gault. Despite popular perceptions of the Vineyard as "Hollywood East", the island is very low-key and quiet; celebrities go to the Vineyard to enjoy the atmosphere, and not to be seen. Locals tend to be protective of celebrity privacy, though recent coverage of celebrity sightings (most notably in the two local newspapers on the Island) has begun to erode that respect for privacy through more frequent reporting on celebrity sightings and famous visitors. In August 2014, both President Obama and Hillary Clinton planned to have overlapping visits to the island, where the presence of security details that create traffic challenges is becoming an annual affair.

Many of the country's most affluent African-American families have enjoyed a century-old tradition of summering on the island. Concentrated primarily in and around the town of Oak Bluffs, and the East Chop area, these families have historically represented the black elite from Boston, Washington, D.C., and New York City. Today, affluent families from around the country have taken to the Vineyard, and the community is known as a popular summer destination for judges, physicians, business executives, surgeons, attorneys, writers, politicians, and professors. The historic presence of African-American residents in Oak Bluffs resulted in its Town Beach being pejoratively called "The Inkwell", a nickname which was reappropriated as an emblem of pride. The Inkwell (1994), directed by Matty Rich, dealt with this close-knit Vineyard community. The Run&Shoot Filmworks Martha's Vineyard African-American Film Festival, held every second week in August, highlights the works of independent and established filmmakers from across the globe. This annual event draws attendees from all across the world.

Since the 19th century, the island has had a sizable community of Portuguese-Americans, concentrated primarily in the three down-Island towns of Oak Bluffs, Tisbury, and Edgartown; they have traditionally worked alongside other island residents in whaling and fishing. It also has a large community of Brazilian immigrants who work mainly in the maintenance of the island's vacation facilities.

The island's permanent residents were profiled in a London Telegraph article showing "the dark side of Martha's Vineyard". In the same month an article titled "Edgartown's Darker Side" appeared in the Boston Globe detailing the extremely poor working conditions suffered by Irish and Serbian students in a newly built private members club in Edgartown. Concerns over munitions that may be buried on Martha's Vineyard, most from World War II, have led to an 8.1 million dollar project to remove and rebuild part of a privately owned barrier beach off the Tisbury Great Pond.

The year-round working population of Martha's Vineyard earns 30 percent less on average than other residents of the state while keeping up with a cost of living that is 60 percent higher than average. Many people are moving to more affordable areas. Schools have seen a successive drop in enrollment over the past few years. Typically home to artists, musicians, and other creative types, the Island has many residents who manage by working several jobs in the summer and taking some time off in the winter. The lack of affordable housing on the island has forced many families to move off-island.

Many high-profile residents, movie stars, politicians, writers, and artists contribute to fundraisers and benefits that raise awareness of the fragile ecosystem of the Vineyard and support community organizations and services. The largest of these is the annual Possible Dreams Auction.

Martha's Vineyard television and radio
Vineyard residents have access to AM/FM radio broadcasting from the Cape Cod, Southeastern Massachusetts and the Greater Boston Area.
More localized content providers include: 
MVTV – Martha's Vineyard Community Television Comcast Channels 13, 14, 15 Community Television
WVVY-LP – 96.7 FM, Martha's Vineyard Community Radio, Inc.
WCAI – 90.1 FM, 91.1 FM, 94.3 FM, Cape and Islands NPR station, radio
WBUA – 92.7 FM, affiliate of WBUR 90.9 FM, Boston's NPR news station, radio;
WMVY – stylized as "Mvyradio" and formerly on 92.7 FM, is now on 88.7 FM and available online

Television broadcasts are available using varied methods from nearby broadcast markets. 
From Boston via U.S. satellite providers, Comcast Xfinity, and RCN Cable providers.
Or via over-the-air television stations from: Boston, New Bedford and Providence, Rhode Island; with reception methods powerful enough to receive it.

Local newspapers
 Vineyard Gazette
 The Martha's Vineyard Times

See also
Dukes County, Massachusetts (for towns and villages of Martha's Vineyard)
Elizabeth Islands
Cuttyhunk
Naushon Island
Martha's Vineyard Magazine
Outer Lands
Vineyard Golf Club

Notes

References

Additional sources
 Gookin, Historical Collections, 53; Railton, "Vineyard's First Harvard men", 91–112.
 Monaghan, E.J. (2005). Learning to Read and Write in Colonial America University of Massachusetts Press. Boston: MA

External links

 Martha's Vineyard Chamber of Commerce 
 Martha's Vineyard Online

 
 
Islands of Dukes County, Massachusetts
Coastal islands of Massachusetts
Populated coastal places in Massachusetts
Tourist attractions in Dukes County, Massachusetts